Grundzāle Parish is an administrative unit of Smiltene Municipality, Latvia

References 

Parishes of Latvia
Smiltene Municipality